The 39th Pennsylvania House of Representatives District is located in southwestern Pennsylvania and has been represented since 2023 by Andrew Kuzma.

District profile
The 39th Pennsylvania House of Representatives District is located in Allegheny County and Washington County and  includes the following areas:

Allegheny County

 Elizabeth
 Elizabeth Township
 Forward Township
 Jefferson Hills
Pleasant Hills
 South Park Township
 West Elizabeth

Washington County

Carroll Township (part)
District 01 
District 02
 Finleyville
Monongahela
 New Eagle
 Union Township

Representatives

Recent election results

References

External links
District map from the United States Census Bureau
Pennsylvania House Legislative District Maps from the Pennsylvania Redistricting Commission.  
Population Data for District 39 from the Pennsylvania Redistricting Commission.

Government of Allegheny County, Pennsylvania
Government of Washington County, Pennsylvania
39